Elections to North Lanarkshire Council were held on 3 May 2007, the same day as the other Scottish local government elections and the Scottish Parliament general election. The election was the first one using 20 new wards created as a results of the Local Governance (Scotland) Act 2004, each ward will elect three or four councillors using the single transferable vote system a form of proportional representation. The new wards replace 70 single-member wards which used the plurality (first past the post) system of election.

Labour managed to retain control of the council, something which the party failed to do in many other parts of Scotland.  Overall they lost 14 seats, most of which went to the Scottish National Party, although the individual seats won by the Conservative Party and the Scottish Liberal Democrats were noteworthy in that these parties had never been represented on North Lanarkshire Council before.

Election results

Ward results

By-Elections since 3 May 2007
Labour's Francis Griffin died on 10 November 2007. Mark Griffin held the seat for the party in the resulting by-election on 31 January 2008 

The SNP's John Wilson resigned following his election as an MSP. Peter Sullivan gained the seat for Labour in the resulting by-election. 

Labour Party's Tony Clarke died on 24 August 2011. Michael McPake held the seat in the resulting by-election.

References

External links
North Lanarkshire Council

2007
2007 Scottish local elections